Fernando López (25 September 1908 – 3 June 2006) was a Spanish equestrian. He competed in two events at the 1952 Summer Olympics.

References

1908 births
2006 deaths
Spanish male equestrians
Olympic equestrians of Spain
Equestrians at the 1952 Summer Olympics
Sportspeople from Granada